John Miner (born August 28, 1965) is a retired ice hockey defenceman. In the 1987–88 season, he played in 14 games for the NHL's Edmonton Oilers. He was born in Moose Jaw, Saskatchewan.

Career statistics

Regular season and playoffs

Awards
 WHL East Second All-Star Team – 1984
 WHL East First All-Star Team – 1985

External links
 

1965 births
Living people
Augsburger Panther players
Canadian expatriate ice hockey players in the United States
Canadian ice hockey defencemen
Edmonton Oilers draft picks
Edmonton Oilers players
EHC Black Wings Linz players
EK Zell am See players
EV Zug players
HC Ajoie players
HC Martigny players
HC Morzine-Avoriaz players
Ice hockey people from Saskatchewan
Kölner Haie players
Lausanne HC players
New Haven Nighthawks players
Nova Scotia Oilers players
Regina Pats players
SC Bern players
SønderjyskE Ishockey players
Sportspeople from Moose Jaw
Wiener EV players